Cave catfish is a name used for species of catfish that live in caves or underground environments.

Species known specifically as cave catfish include:
 Clarias cavernicola (Namibia)
 Horaglanis krishnai (India)

Other catfish that live in caves include:

 Prietella species (Mexico)
 Trogloglanis pattersoni (USA)
 Satan eurystomus (USA)
 Trichomycterus itacarambiensis (Brazil)